The common goby (Pomatoschistus microps) is a species of ray-finned fish native to fresh and brackish waters along the Atlantic and Baltic Sea coasts of Europe and northern Africa, with a range stretching from Norway to Morocco and Mauritania.  It is also found in the Canary Islands.  This species reaches a maximum length of  TL.

Description
The common goby has two dorsal fins with a narrow gap between them, the anterior one consisting of six to eight spines and the posterior one eight to eleven soft rays. The pelvic fins are fused. There are 39 to 51 scales along the lateral line and these scales are slightly larger than those of the sand goby (Pomatoschistus minutus). The caudal fin is rounded. In males, there is a conspicuous dark spot on the anterior dorsal fin and dark markings at the base of the pectorals and the caudal fin. Otherwise the colour is light grey or sandy brown with indistinct dark markings and dark striations on the pale fins. The colour of the male darkens during the breeding season and his fins become more coloured.

Habits
The common goby breeds from February to September, laying its eggs under shells, stones or on aquatic plants. The male then guards the eggs until they hatch about nine days later. Common gobies can live for up to three years. Their diet is mostly small crustaceans, worms, harpacticoids, amphipods, chironomid larvae and mites. The common goby is normally found in similar locations but shallower water than the sand goby.

References

External links
MarLIN information on the common goby in the British portion of range

External links
 

common goby
Fish of the East Atlantic
Fish of the North Sea
Fish of the Baltic Sea
Marine fish of Europe
common goby
Taxa named by Henrik Nikolai Krøyer